Solnit is a surname. Notable people with the surname include:

Albert J. Solnit (1919–2002), American psychoanalyst
Rebecca Solnit (born 1961), American writer